The IEEE Marie Sklodowska-Curie Award is a Technical Field Award that was established by the IEEE Board of Directors in 2008.  This award may be presented for outstanding contributions to the field of nuclear and plasma sciences and engineering.

This award may be presented to an individual, individuals on a team, or up to three multiple recipients.

Recipients of this award receive a bronze medal, certificate, and honorarium. 

This award was presented for the first time in 2011. The recipients include the following:
 2021: Michel Defrise
 2020: Michael A. Lieberman
 2019: Sanjiv "Sam" Gambhir
 2018: David R. Nygren, an American particle physicist, for "pioneering radiation detector developments, enabling major discoveries in diverse areas of science."
 2017: Chandrashekhar J. Joshi, an American experimental plasma physicist, for "groundbreaking contributions to and leadership in the field of plasma particle accelerators."
 2016: Simon R. Cherry, an American positron emission tomography expert and biomedical engineer, for "contributions to the development and application of in vivo molecular imaging systems."
 2015: Noah Hershkowitz, an American plasma physicist, for "innovative research and inspiring education in basic and applied plasma science."
 2014: Three winners, for "developing maximum-likelihood image reconstruction in emission tomography leading to its widespread and effective use in healthcare."
 H. Malcolm Hudson, an Australian mathematician and statistics professor at Macquarie University in New South Wales.
 Brian F. Hutton, Professor of Medical Physics in Nuclear Medicine and Molecular Imaging Science at the Institute of Nuclear Medicine at the University College London.
 Lawrence A. Shepp, posthumously, an American mathematician.
 2013: Veljko Radeka, a Croatian-American engineer and Brookhaven National Laboratory research scientist, for "the development of new radiation detectors, electronics, and systems that operate at the fundamental limits of performance, enabling discoveries in many areas of science."
 2012: Gennady Andreevich Mesyats, a Soviet-born physicist, for "founding the field of nanosecond pulsed power and for seminal contributions to the physics of vacuum breakdown at high power levels."
 2011: Ned Birdsall, an American experimental plasma physicist, for "theoretical investigations and fundamental discoveries involving microwave tubes, electron beam physics and particle-in-cell simulation of plasma physics."

References

External links 
 IEEE Medals, Technical Field Awards, and Recognitions
 IEEE Marie Sklodowska-Curie Award page on IEEE web site
 List of recipients of the IEEE Marie Sklodowska-Curie Award

Marie Sklodowska-Curie Award
Engineering awards